Bellisarius was launched in Sweden in 1783, possibly under another name. She first appeared in Lloyd's Register (LR) in 1795. She was lost on 17 March 1796 in a tragic collision with a large Royal Navy warship.

From Gibraltar, Bellisarius sailed to Barbados, and then back to England. She also sailed to and from Jamaica.

Belisarius was carrying troops and their dependents to the West Indies. Captain Barge and about 110 persons were saved.

A witness on  wrote in a letter to The Observer newspaper that the accident was "occasioned by a dispute between the Master and the second Mate [of the Bellisarius] when wearing ship; by which, not paying proper attention, they fell athwart the Royal Sovereign, when the Sovereign's gib-boom and bowsprit took their main-mast, and struck her amid ship, by which she almost instantly sunk. To add to the distress of this dreadful scene, an unhappy woman, with her infant in her arms, who stood on the quarter-deck of the Bellisarius, attempted to save the life of her infant by throwing it on board the Royal Sovereign at the instant of the two ships meeting, but unfortunately it fell between the two ships sides, and was crushed to atoms before the eyes of its unhappy mother, who, in her distraction of mind, instantly precipitated herself into the sea, and shared the grave of her child."

Citations

1783 ships
Ships built in Sweden
Age of Sail merchant ships of England
Maritime incidents in 1796